Giovanni Battista Gentile, O.S.B. (1658–1695) was a Roman Catholic prelate who served as Bishop of Ajaccio (1694–1695).

Biography
Giovanni Battista Gentile was born in Genoa, Italy in 1658 and ordained a priest in the Order of Saint Benedict.
On 13 September 1694, he was appointed during the papacy of Pope Innocent XII as Bishop of Ajaccio.
On 19 September 1694, he was consecrated bishop by Bandino Panciatici, Cardinal-Priest of San Pancrazio, with Stefano Giuseppe Menatti, Bishop of Como, and Pierre Lambert Ledrou, Titular Bishop of Porphyreon, serving as co-consecrators. 
He served as Bishop of Ajaccio until his death on 2 September 1695.

References 

17th-century French Roman Catholic bishops
Bishops appointed by Pope Innocent XII
1658 births
1695 deaths
Benedictine bishops
Bishops of Ajaccio